"Abre Tu Corazón" (Translated: Open Your Heart) is the lead off single from María José Castillo's first studio album, María José.

Background and promotion
The single was set to be released on a CD single, but due to the failure of Castillo's "María José" internationally it was cancelled. The CD single was set to include the album version of the song, the instrumental version, the a cappella version, her second single "Vuela" and others. Even that the release was cancelled, a fan made version of the CD single is often found by fans.

Castillo did not film any music video for the song, but fan-made videos using several live performances, mixes from public appearances, and her performances on Latin American Idol are available.

Track listings
The following track listings are for the original track listing of the CD single and the fan-made CD single track listing respectively.

Original CD single track listing
 "Abre Tu Corazón" (Album version) — 3:25
 "Abre Tu Corazón" (Instrumental) — 3:30
 "Abre Tu Corazón" (A Capella) — 2:33
 "Abre Tu Corazón" (Live at Latin American Idol) — 3:46

Fan-Made CD Single
 "Abre Tu Corazón" (Album version) — 3:25
 "Abre Tu Corazón" Live at Latin American Idol) — 3:46

External links
 Official Website

2008 singles
2008 songs